The Mitsuoka MC-1 is a microcar produced by the Japanese company Mitsuoka. It lacks many items a normal car would have, (i.e. radio, airbags and GPS). When the MC-1 first went on sale, it had a base price of 385,000 yen. By 2005, the price had become 488,250 yen. For the 2005 model year, the engine was shrunk by 1 cc to a 49 cc engine.

Variants

 MC-1 T 
 There was also a larger T variant that is  heavier than the standard MC-1. There is a delivery box mount and a luggage bed. The mechanicals were the same as the MC-1.
 MC-1 EV 
 The EV version powered by a DC electric motor which produces 0.59 kilowatts (0.8 hp) of power. There are three different motors each with a different wattage: 72V, 48V, and 12V motors.

Design
Mitsuoka wanted to make the MC-1 easy to take care of. There is even an owner's manual on Mitsuoka's website. The interior is simple, a large speedometer with some sensors, gear shifting stick, steering wheel and a seat. The body is mostly plastic. The 'doors' are fabric. For 2004, the MC-1 was slightly redesigned by adding a slit under the headlights.

Safety

The MC-1 is extremely unsafe as most of the car is plastic and fabric. It has no airbags, but it does have a 3-point seatbelt.

Marketing

It was marketed under the slogan, 'Microcar for your life.'

References

Microcars
Cars introduced in 1998
MC-1
Retro-style automobiles
2000s cars